Alessandra Maria Luigia Anna Polizzi di Sorrentino (born 28 August 1971), better known as Alex Polizzi, is an English hotelier, businesswoman, and television personality. Since 2008, she has appeared on The Hotel Inspector on Channel 5, in which she is the central figure.

Early life
Polizzi was born on 28 August 1971 in Poplar, London, England. Polizzi is of Italian descent.

Polizzi comes from a family of hoteliers. Her mother is the Hon. Olga Polizzi, a hotel designer who is a daughter of Lord Forte and the sister of Sir Rocco Forte. Her father was Italian marquess Alessandro Polizzi di Sorrentino, who died in a car accident in 1980.

Polizzi read English at St Catherine's College, Oxford. She trained at the Mandarin Oriental, Hong Kong, and worked for Marco Pierre White.

Hotel career
Polizzi and a baker boyfriend started a wholesale bakery, Millers Bespoke Bakery, supplying bread to Selfridges, Harvey Nichols, and Fortnum & Mason.

She managed the Hotel Endsleigh in Milton Abbot, near Tavistock in Devon, which is owned by her mother Olga. In 2021, Polizzi and her mother opened The Star in Alfriston, in East Sussex, in their first joint venture.

Television career
Since 2008, Polizzi has presented the Channel 5 series The Hotel Inspector, replacing Ruth Watson. The show sees Polizzi visiting struggling British hotels to try to turn their fortunes around by giving advice and suggestions to the owners/managers, and often undertaking renovation projects on their behalf.

She also fronts the BBC Two series, Alex Polizzi: The Fixer, which focuses on her turning around family businesses, not just hotels. The first series aired in 2012; the second in 2013; a third in 2014 and a fourth in 2015. Polizzi also presented a revisited series called The Fixer Returns in 2013, as well as a Christmas special, which aired in December 2013.

In October 2014, Polizzi launched a new Channel 5 series, Alex Polizzi's Secret Italy, where she visits either lesser-known places within Italy or well-known towns and cities and, using local connections, shows areas that tourists would not ordinarily experience. In October 2014, it was announced that Polizzi would host a new BBC Two series, Alex Polizzi: Chefs on Trial, where she visits various food outlets. The series began airing on 20 April 2015.

In March 2017, Polizzi released Spectacular Spain with Alex Polizzi and then Our Dream Hotel on 6 June. From February 2018, she invited her Irish brother-in-law, the restaurateur Oliver Peyton, to join her in a new Channel 5 series Peyton And Polizzi’s Restaurant Rescue, where they pool their experience to play firefighters and turn around failing restaurants.<ref>"Peyton And Polizzi’s Restaurant Rescue". Channel 5 website, 2018-02-07.</ref>

In August 2021, Alex Polizzi: My Hotel Nightmare aired on Channel 5, which chronicled the renovation of The Star during the COVID-19 pandemic prior to its opening.

Personal life
Polizzi lives in London with her husband Marcus Miller, whom she married in 2007, along with their daughter and son. Polizzi is bilingual, being fluent in English and Italian. Her sister Charlotte is married to Oliver Peyton, an Irish restaurateur and a judge on the BBC television series Great British Menu''. Sir Rocco Forte is her uncle.

She had a Roman Catholic upbringing, and spent "every Sunday of her childhood" at the Church of the Immaculate Conception on Farm Street, London.

Polizzi backed the Leave campaign during the 2016 British referendum on membership of the EU, but has spoken subsequently of her concern that Brexit could threaten the supply of labour into the hospitality and hotel industry.

Filmography

Television

References

External links
 
 Representation at Curtis Brown Talent Agency

1971 births
Living people
English people of Italian descent
Alumni of St Catherine's College, Oxford
British hoteliers
English television presenters
Businesspeople from London
People from Poplar, London
Forte family